Natalie A. Manley is a member of the Illinois House of Representatives representing the 98th district since 2013. She is a member of the Democratic party. The 98th district includes all or parts of Bolingbrook, Crest Hill, Crystal Lawns, Romeoville and Joliet.

Early life, education and career
Manley is a certified public accountant with a BA in Business Administration from the University of St. Francis.  Prior to her election, she worked as an accountant at a private firm and co-hosted a talk show on local radio station WJOL.

Illinois General Assembly
Manley was first elected to the Illinois House in November 2012, assuming office in January 2013. In January 2019, she was appointed Assistant Majority Leader.

As of July 3, 2022, Representative Manley is a member of the following Illinois House committees:

 Business & Innovation Subcommittee (HLBR-BUIN)
 Elementary & Secondary Education: School Curriculum & Policies Committee (HELM)
 Ethics & Elections Committee (SHEE)
 Labor & Commerce Committee (HLBR)
 Police & Fire Committee (SHPF)
 Workforce Development Subcommittee (HLBR-WORK)

References

External links
Representative Natalie A. Manley (D) 98th District at the Illinois General Assembly
 
Rep. Natalie Manley at Illinois House Democrats
2012 Editorial Board Questionnaire at the Chicago Tribune

Living people
Democratic Party members of the Illinois House of Representatives
Year of birth missing (living people)
21st-century American politicians
21st-century American women politicians
Women state legislators in Illinois
People from Joliet, Illinois